Carteri is a surname. Notable people with the surname include:

Carmelo Carteri (born 1956), Canadian football player 
Rosanna Carteri (1930–2020), Italian soprano

See also
Carter (name)